Tracey Thorn (born 26 September 1962) is a British singer and songwriter. She is best known as a member of the duo Everything but the Girl from 1982 to 1999. She was in the band Marine Girls from 1980 to 1983, and since 2007 has been active as a solo artist.

Early life
The youngest of three children, Thorn was born in Brookmans Park, Hertfordshire. She grew up in nearby Hatfield and studied English at the University of Hull, where she graduated in 1984 with First Class Honours. She later took an MA degree at Birkbeck, University of London.

Music career

Stern Bops (1979–1980)
Thorn began her musical career in the punk-pop hybrid group Stern Bops playing guitar and providing some vocal backing.

Marine Girls (1980–1983)

Thorn then formed Marine Girls as primary songwriter, playing guitar and sharing vocals. The band released two albums (Beach Party in 1981 and Lazy Ways in 1983) and three singles. The group disbanded in 1983.

Everything but the Girl (1982–2000, 2023–)

Thorn met Ben Watt at the University of Hull where they were both students, and both signed as solo artists to Cherry Red Records. Their first album together was Eden, released in 1984. Everything but the Girl released a body of work that spanned two decades. Their biggest chart success came in 1995, when DJ Todd Terry remixed a song from their Amplified Heart album. "Missing" peaked at number three on the UK Singles Chart, topped the charts in countries such as Canada, Denmark, Germany and Italy and peaked within the top ten of the charts in many countries, including Australia, France, the Republic of Ireland, Sweden and the United States.

Everything but the Girl was inactive from 2000 to 2022. During that time, Watt played on some filmed performances of Thorn's solo work and on her 2011 recording of the xx's "Night Time".

In November 2022, Watt and Thorn announced on social media that they had recorded a new album as Everything but the Girl. The album was scheduled for release in spring 2023.

Solo career and collaborations (1982–present)
Thorn's first solo work was a mini-album entitled A Distant Shore (1982). A re-recorded version of the track "Plain Sailing" was released as a single, and was included on the Pillows & Prayers Cherry Red records compilation album.

In the 1980s, Thorn contributed guest vocals and backing vocals for The Style Council on the track "The Paris Match" (from the album Café Bleu), The Go-Betweens on their track Head Full of Steam, Working Week on the single "Venceremos (We Will Win)" and Lloyd Cole and the Commotions on the track "Big Snake".

In the 1990s, she collaborated with Massive Attack on several projects, including the soundtrack for the motion picture Batman Forever where she contributed with "The Hunter Gets Captured by the Game". Their first project together was the song "Protection"  (for which she wrote the lyrics and melody) from the album by Massive Attack of the same name. She also co-wrote and sings on the track "Better Things". She also sang "The Tree Knows Everything" on Adam F's debut album, Colours.

Just prior to her return to recording in 2007, Thorn contributed vocals to the song "Damage" by the band Tiefschwarz on the album Eat Books.

In March 2007, Tracey Thorn released her second solo album Out of the Woods on Virgin Records (Worldwide) and on Astralwerks (USA). It was produced by Ewan Pearson, who kept collaborating with her in subsequent releases. The first single from the album, "It's All True", accompanied by remixes from the likes of Kris Menace & Martin Buttrich, was released on 7 February and reached No. 75 on the UK singles chart while the album met critical acclaim and peaked at No. 38 on the Albums Chart.

In 2008, Thorn collaborated with the Hungarian acoustic downtempo group The Unbending Trees on their single "Overture", which also featured on their album Chemically Happy (Is The New Sad), released by her partner Ben Watt.

In 2009, Thorn collaborated with the Swedish singer-songwriter Jens Lekman for a cover of The Magnetic Fields' "Yeah! Oh Yeah!" for a compilation album commemorating twenty years of Merge Records, Score! 20 Years of Merge Records: The Covers!.

Thorn's third solo album Love and Its Opposite was released in May 2010 on Ben Watt's Strange Feeling Records in the UK, and on Merge Records in the US.  Recorded in London and Berlin and produced by Ewan Pearson, it contained eight new songs and two cover versions, "Come on Home to Me" by Lee Hazlewood, and "You Are a Lover" by The Unbending Trees.

Thorn's fourth solo album was a Christmas album entitled Tinsel and Lights.  It was released in late October 2012, and included covers of songs by Carol Hall, The White Stripes, Ron Sexsmith, Randy Newman, Joni Mitchell, Sufjan Stevens, Low and Scritti Politti, plus two original songs and contributions from Green Gartside and Ben Watt. The original song "Joy" is featured in the 2012 film All Is Bright with Paul Giamatti and Paul Rudd.

In 2013 Thorn wrote and recorded the original music for The Falling, the debut feature film by filmmaker Carol Morley, which premiered at the London Film Festival 2014.

A compilation album, Solo: Songs and Collaborations 1982–2015, was released in the UK on 23 October 2015. It features 34 tracks on two discs.

On 17 January 2018, Thorn announced the release of her album Record, which was released on 2 March. The album was produced by Ewan Pearson, and features contributions from Corinne Bailey Rae, Shura, Jona Ma and Stella and Jenny from Warpaint. Along with the announcement, Thorn released the debut single and video from the project, entitled "Queen".

Writing
Virago published Thorn's memoir Bedsit Disco Queen: How I Grew Up and Tried to Be a Pop Star early in 2013. It received widespread critical acclaim and was a Sunday Times Top Ten best-seller.

In 2014, she began a regular column ('Off the Record') for the New Statesman. The column ran until spring of 2022.

In 2015 Virago published her second book, Naked at the Albert Hall, about singers and singing.

She published a third memoir in 2019: Another Planet: A Teenager in Suburbia (2019).

2021 saw the publication of a fourth book, My Rock 'n' Roll Friend, focused on her friendship with Lindy Morrison of the Go-Betweens, and on the experiences of female musicians in the male-dominated music scene.

Personal life
After 28 years as a couple, Thorn and the other half of Everything But The Girl, Ben Watt, married in 2009 at Chelsea Register Office. They live in Hampstead, North London. The couple have twin girls, Jean and Alfie, born in 1998. They also have a son, Blake, born in 2001.

Awards and nominations
{| class=wikitable
|-
! Year !! Awards !! Work !! Category !! Result
|-
| 1995
| MTV Europe Music Awards
| rowspan=2|"Protection" (with Massive Attack)
| Best Video
| 
|-
| 1996
| Brit Awards
| Best British Video
| 
|-
| 2011
| International Dance Music Awards
| "Why Does the Wind?"
| Best House/Garage Track
| 
|-
| 2017
| Artist and Manager Awards
| rowspan=3|Herself
| Artists’ Artist Award
| 
|-
| rowspan=5|2018
| AIM Independent Music Awards
| Outstanding Contribution to Music
| 
|-
| rowspan=3|Classic Pop Reader Awards
| Artist of the Year
| 
|-
| Record
| Album of the Year
| 
|-
| '"Queen"
| Single of the Year
| 
|-
|Best Art Vinyl
| Record
| Best Art Vinyl
| 
|-
| rowspan=2|2019
| rowspan=2|GAFFA-Prisen Awards
| Herself
| Best International Artist
| 
|-
| Record
| Best International Album
|

Discography

Studio albums

EPs
2010 Opposites EP (contains experimental remixes of tracks from Love and Its Opposite)
2011 You Are A Lover EP (10" green vinyl released for Record Store Day)
2011 Night Time EP
2014 Molly Drake Songs

Compilations
2011 Extended Plays 2010–2011
2015 Solo: Songs and Collaborations 1982–2015

Singles

Collaborations

References

Sources
Bedsit Disco Queen; How I Grew Up and Tried to Be a Pop Star by Tracey Thorn, Little Brown (2013)

External links

Official Tracey Thorn website

1962 births
Living people
20th-century English singers
20th-century English women singers
21st-century English singers
21st-century English women singers
British alternative rock musicians
Cherry Red Records artists
English contraltos
English dance musicians
English folk musicians
English house musicians
English women guitarists
English guitarists
English women in electronic music
English women singer-songwriters
Merge Records artists
Musicians from Hertfordshire
New Statesman people
People from Welwyn Hatfield (district)
British autoharp players